Utah is an unincorporated community in Warren County, in the U.S. state of Illinois.

History
A post office called Utah was established in 1850, and remained in operation until 1906. The community was named after the Utah Territory.

References

Unincorporated communities in Warren County, Illinois
Unincorporated communities in Illinois